Science City at Union Station is a family-friendly interactive science center that features traveling exhibitions, The Arvin Gottlieb Planetarium, City Extreme Screen theatre, and more than 120 hands-on displays. It is located inside Union Station at 30 West Pershing Road in Kansas City, Missouri.

It was the main feature in the bi-state renovation vote of 1997. It was part of a renovation plan for Union Station after being closed for a short period of time when Trizec, a Canadian redevelopment firm had failed to redevelop the station. It opened in November 1999.

References

Museums in Kansas City, Missouri
Planetaria in the United States
Science museums in Missouri